Strand tube station  may refer to two different London Underground stations:

 Aldwych tube station, a disused Piccadilly line station, originally known as Strand until 1915
 Charing Cross tube station; the Northern line part of this station, known as Strand from 1915 to 1973

See also
Strand station (disambiguation)